The 2015 Nigerian Senate election in Benue State was held on March 28, 2015, to elect members of the Nigerian Senate to represent Delta State. Peter Nwaboshi representing Delta North, James Manager representing Delta South won on the platform of the People's Democratic Party (Nigeria) while Ovie Omo-Agege representing Delta Central won on the platform of the Labour Party (Nigeria).

Overview

Summary

Results

Delta Central 
Labour Party candidate Ovie Omo-Agege won the election, defeating People's Democratic Party candidate Ighoyota Amori, All Progressives Congress candidate John Agoda and other party candidates.

Delta North 
People's Democratic Party candidate Peter Nwaboshi won the election, defeating All Progressives Congress candidate Njideaka Okwudili, Labour Party candidate Nwadiani Ikechukwu, and other party candidates.

Delta South 
People's Democratic Party candidate James Manager won the election, defeating All Progressives Congress candidate Pius Omike, Labour Party candidate Oniyetsoritse Elijah, and other party candidates.

References

Delta State Senate elections
March 2015 events in Nigeria
Del